Evgeny Ilgizovich Bareev (born 21 November 1966) is a Russian-Canadian chess player  and trainer. Awarded the title Grandmaster by FIDE in 1989, he was ranked fourth in the FIDE world rankings in October 2003, with an Elo rating of 2739.

Chess career
Bareev was world under 16 champion in 1982. In 1992 he graduated from the Moscow Institute of Physical Culture.

The biggest success in his career was winning the Corus supertournament in Wijk aan Zee 2002. In this event he scored 9/13 points ahead of elite players like Alexander Grischuk, Michael Adams, Alexander Morozevich, and Peter Leko.
 
Bareev is triple winner at Hastings (in 1990/91, 1991/92 and 1992/93, shared with Judit Polgar; all three editions were then still played as an invitational tournament in round-robin format). He also won the strong Enghien-les-Bains tournament held in France in 2003. In a man vs machine contest in January 2003, Bareev took on the chess program HIARCS in a four game-match: all four games were drawn.

He was a second to Vladimir Kramnik in the Classical World Chess Championship 2000 against Garry Kasparov.

He was finalist of the World Cup 2000, where he lost to Viswanathan Anand, and of the Rapid World Cup 2001, where he lost to Kasparov.

His most notable participation in the World Chess Championship events was the Candidates Tournament for the Classical World Chess Championship 2004 in Dortmund 2002. Bareev reached the semifinals, but lost his match against Veselin Topalov.

At the Chess World Cup 2005, Bareev qualified for the Candidates Tournament for the World Chess Championship 2007, played in May–June 2007. He won his first round match against Judit Polgár (+2-1=3), but was eliminated when he lost his second round match against Peter Leko (+0-2=3).

In 2010 he tied for first with Konstantin Chernyshov, Lê Quang Liêm and Ernesto Inarkiev in the Moscow Open. In September 2015, Bareev transferred to the Canadian Chess Federation. In 2019 he won the Canadian Zonal Championship, therefore qualifying for the FIDE World Cup.

Best results:

1982 Guayaquil (U16 World Ch.) – 1st place
1985 Kharkov (USSR Ch., 1st league) – 1st place
1986 Kiev (USSR Ch.) – 2nd – 7th place
1986 Gausdal (U20 World Ch.) – 3rd – 5th place
1987 Vrnjacka Banja – 1st – 2nd place
1988 Budapest – 1st place
1989 Trnava – 1st place
1989 Moscow (Ch.) – 1st place
1990 Rome Open – 2nd – 6th place
1990 Dortmund Open – 1st place
1990 Leningrad (USSR Ch.) – 1st – 4th place
1990/91 Hastings – 1st place
1991 Biel – 2nd place
1991 Bled/Rogaska Slatina – 2nd place
1991/92 Hastings – 1st place
1992 Dortmund – 3rd place
1992/93 Hastings – 1st – 2nd place
1994 Pardubice GM – 1st place
1994 Tilburg – 2nd place
1995 Wijk-aan-Zee – 2nd place
1995 Leon – 1st – 2nd place
1995 Elista (Russian Ch.) – 1st -5th place
1996 Belgrade (terminated after first leg) – 1st place
1996 Vienna Open – 1st – 8th place
1997 Elista (Russian Ch.) – 2nd place
1999 Sarajevo Bosna – 2nd – 3rd place
2000 Montecatini Terme – 2nd place
2000 Shenyang, FIDE World Cup – 2nd place
2001 Cannes, World Cup (rapid) – 2nd place
2002 Dortmund (Einstein Candidates) – ½ finals
2002 Moscow, Russia – The World (Rapid) – 1st-2nd result for Team Russia
2002 Wijk aan Zee – 1st place
2002 Warsaw (rapid) – 1st place
2003 Wijk-aan-Zee – 3rd place
2003 Enghien-les-Bains – 1st place
2003 Моnaco (rapid) – 1st place
2004 Monaco (rapid) – 2nd place
2005 Kazan (Russian Ch., Major League) – 1st – 2nd place
2006 Poikovsky – 2nd – 5th place
2006 Havana, Capablanca Memorial – 2nd place
2008 Leon (rapid) – 1st place
2009 Sankt-Petersburg (Russian Cup) – 1st place
2010 Moscow-open – 1st – 4th place

Team competitions
Bareev was a member of the Soviet national team in the 1990 Chess Olympiad and of the Russian national team in the Chess Olympiads of 1994, 1996, 1998 and 2006.  He won the team gold medal in 1990, 1994, 1996 and 1998. He has played on the Canadian team at the Olympiad since 2016. Bareev is also two-time winner of the World Team Chess Championship (1997 and 2005) and two-time winner of the European Team Chess Championship (1992 and 2003).

Bareev is four-time winner of the European Club Cup with three different clubs: "Lion" of France (1994), "Ladia" of Russia (1997) and "Bosna" of Bosnia and Herzegovina (1999 and 2000).

Trainer
In 2006, Bareev organized a grandmaster chess school for top Russian junior players and headed it until 2010. In 2009-10 Bareev worked with Lê Quang Liêm, who became World Blitz Champion in 2013.

From 2010 to 2011, he was the head coach of the Russian men's chess team. During that time they won silver medals at the 2010 Chess Olympiad.  Between 2010 and 2014, Bareev was the head coach of Russia's junior's, men's and women's national teams. In recent years, he has been coaching Canada's top juniors such as Razvan Preotu and Michael Song.

Books
Evgenij Bareev, Französische Verteidigung, Chess Informant (1995)

References

External links
 
 
 
 
 
 Toronto Star interview in 2016
 

1966 births
Living people
Chess grandmasters
Soviet chess players
Russian chess players
Canadian chess players
World Youth Chess Champions
Chess Olympiad competitors
Chess coaches
National team coaches
People from Chelyabinsk Oblast
Russian emigrants to Canada
Naturalized citizens of Canada